The Church of St. Mary Magdalen is a former Roman Catholic parish church under the authority of the Roman Catholic Archdiocese of New York, in Manhattan, New York City.

The church was originally established in 1873 to serve a German Catholic population. It was a mid-block gable-fronted brick single-cell building with Romanesque details located at 529 E 17th Street. In 1877 the parish added a rectory at 527 E 17th Street and a school at 523 E 17th Street. The next year, the Sisters of St. Dominic began operating the school. Their convent was located north of the school at 526 E 18th street. All buildings were demolished in the early 1940s to make way for Stuyvesant Town–Peter Cooper Village.

In 1945 , the parish moved to its final location at Avenue D between 12th Street & 13th Street. The parish is now closed.

References 

Closed churches in the Roman Catholic Archdiocese of New York
Closed churches in New York City
Roman Catholic churches in Manhattan
Demolished churches in New York City
Demolished buildings and structures in Manhattan